The East Torrens Football Association (ETFA) was an Australian rules football competition based in the eastern and north-eastern suburbs of Adelaide, South Australia until it merged with the North Adelaide District Football Association to form the Norwood-North Football Association at the end of the 1968 season. It was formed in 1916 for the purpose of “fostering junior football in the Norwood district."

Member Clubs

Premierships

A-Grade 
1915 - Norwood Union 
1916 - in recess
1917 - in recess
1918 - in recess
1919 - Payneham
1920 - Norwood Union  
1921 - Payneham
1922
1923 - Norwood Union
1924 - Newstead  
1925 - Norwood Union 
1926 - Norwood Union
1927 - Kensington 
1928 - Kensington  undefeated
1929 - Kensington   
1930 - Kensington
1931 - Kensington  
1932 - Norwood Union  
1933 - Glenroy
1934 - Magill Royal 
1935 - Payneham  
1936 - Payneham  
1937 - Payneham
1938 - Ashton
1939 - Norwood Union  
1940 - Ashton undefeated 
1941 - Norwood Union
1942-1944 - in recess
1945 - Payneham
1946 - Norwood Union  
1947 - Norwood Union  
1948 - Magill Royal 
1949 - Kensington Gardens  
1950 - Glenroy 
1951 - Glenroy 
1952 - Norwood Union  
1953 - Glenroy 
1954 - Glenroy 
1955 - Eastwood
1956 - YMCA
1957
1958 - Glenroy
1959 - Athelstone
1960 - Athelstone
1961 - Norwood Union
1962 - Kensington Gardens
1963 - Athelstone
1964 - Kensington Gardens
1965 - Athelstone
1966 - Athelstone
1967 - Hectorville
1968 - West Torrens Reserves

References 

44  Register, March 6, 1922

1916 establishments in Australia
1968 disestablishments in Australia
Defunct Australian rules football competitions in South Australia